The Future Is Worse Than The Past is a compilation album by DIY home recording pioneer R. Stevie Moore. It was released on July 4, 1999. It was the first of four R. Stevie Moore albums released by the German record label Pink Lemon.

Critical reception

When the album was released, Billboard wrote, "... Moore steps into the fore with yet another collection of lo-fi symphonies... Unsung by all save a small cult, Moore deserves a wider audience. Perhaps this fine release will help him find it."

Track listing
All the songs were written by R. Stevie Moore, except where noted.
"Found a Job" (David Byrne) – 4:47
"Misplacement" – 3:27
"Everyone, But Everyone" – 6:59
"Where We Are Right Now" – 3:13
"Academy Fight Song" (Clint Conley) – 3:08
"Oh Baby Baby Baby" – 2:56 
"Rose Garden" (Joe South) – 2:56
"Bladder" – 7:03
"Play Myself Some Music" – 3:43
"Idiot Opium" – 5:50
"Column 88" – 3:35
"Fletcher Honorama" (Ron Mael) – 3:00
"Once and For All" – 3:05
"Backbone Break" – 0:50
"Baby Scratch My Back" (Slim Harpo) – 3:04
"For Vini" – 3:14
"Disaster in the USA" – 2:14

References

External links 
Partial discography and interview

R. Stevie Moore albums
1999 albums